Hazel Harper is a former New Zealand international lawn bowler.

Bowls career
Harper won a silver medal at the 1977 World Outdoor Bowls Championship in Worthing in the triples event with Cis Winstanley and Pearl Dymond and a bronze medal in the team event (Taylor Trophy).

Harper was first capped in 1977 when bowling for Southland Bowls Club and won 26 caps.

References

New Zealand female bowls players
20th-century New Zealand women